Say It Is So is the fifth studio album by New Zealand singer/songwriter Tim Finn.

After the release of 1993's Before & After Finn was left without a record company. He met producer Jay Joyce in Nashville, in 1998 with whom he worked. No record company was interested in the album so he released it independently.

Track listing

In the track Some Dumb Reason there is the line "feeding the gods". This became the title of Finn's next album (and continues a long-standing continuity theme of Split Enz, Crowded House and Neil and Tim Finn albums using phrases from their other songs). In contrast, the Feeding the Gods album also contained a song entitled Say It Is So.

Personnel
 Tim Finn - vocals, piano, acoustic guitar
 Jay Joyce - guitars, keyboards, sounds
 Chris Feinstein - bass
 Ken Coomer - drums
 Giles Reaves - drums on Underwater Mountain, Shiver, Twinkle, Rest

Additional personnel
 Bruce Bouton - pedal steel
 Matt Johnson - drums on Currents
 Kalai Lam - ukulele, log drum, nose flute on Currents
 Laurence Maddy - guitar on Shiver
 Julie Miller - backing vocals
 Jackie Orsazky - second bass guitar & string arrangement on Underwater Mountain

References

Tim Finn albums
1999 albums
Albums produced by Jay Joyce